Thomas Archer, 1st Baron Archer (21 July 1695 – 19 October 1768) was an English Member of Parliament, who was created Baron Archer in 1747. His arms are blazoned: Azure three arrows or.

Biography

He was the eldest son and heir of Andrew Archer of Umberslade Hall in Tanworth in Arden, Warwickshire and his wife Elizabeth Dashwood. His younger brother was Henry Archer. Thomas succeeded his father to Umberslade in 1741.

He served as Member of Parliament of Warwick from 1735 to 1741 and then for the rotten borough of Bramber in Sussex from 1741 until 1747, when he was raised to the peerage.  He was also Custos Rotulorum of Flintshire from 1750 to 1753.

In 1734 he became a trustee, together with his younger brother, for the newly formed colony of Georgia on the east coast of America.

He married Catherine Tipping, daughter of Sir Thomas Tipping, 1st Baronet and Anne Cheke, and had a son and daughters.
He was succeeded by his son Andrew Archer, 2nd Baron Archer, on whose death in 1778 the title became extinct. His daughter Catherine married Other Windsor, 4th Earl of Plymouth.

See also
 Trustees for the Establishment of the Colony of Georgia in America
 Umberslade Obelisk

Ancestry

References

External links
thePeerage.com: Thomas Archer, 1st Baron Archer

1695 births
1768 deaths
People from Tanworth-in-Arden
1
Peers of Great Britain created by George II
Members of the Parliament of Great Britain for English constituencies
British MPs 1734–1741
British MPs 1741–1747